Arthrosaura reticulata, the yellowbelly arthrosaura, is a species of lizard in the family Gymnophthalmidae. It is found in Ecuador, Brazil, Venezuela, Guyana, Colombia, Peru, and Bolivia.

References

Arthrosaura
Reptiles described in 1881
Taxa named by Arthur William Edgar O'Shaughnessy